BBC Two's historical farm series are five documentary series first broadcast on BBC Two from 2005 to 2013. They illustrate the lives of people: farmers, labourers, fishermen, housewives, etc. in a variety of historical contexts. Historians and archaeologists play the parts of ordinary people and live and work immersed in the time specified.  The team perform the everyday crafts such as hunting, gathering, sowing and reaping as well as experimenting with more specialised work like blacksmithing, woodcutting and mining under the eyes of an experienced tutor. Each series (save the first) has taken place at a public living history site that provides external in-period experts, experience, and flavour. The Wartime Farm series includes conversations with men and women who remember the time. All were produced by David Upshal for Lion Television and broadcast on BBC Two.

Related series
Several other shorter series featuring the same people and production staff have been made:
 A Tudor Feast at Christmas, at Haddon Hall, 1 episode (2006)
 Victorian Farm Christmas, 3 episodes (2009) 
 Victorian Pharmacy at Blists Hill Victorian Town, 4 episodes (2010)
 Secrets of the Castle at Guédelon Castle, 5 episodes (2014)
 Victorian Bakers at Blists Hill Victorian Town, 4 episodes (2016)
 Full Steam Ahead courtesy of British Rail, 6 episodes (2016), filmed predominantly at the Beamish Museum.  
 24 Hours in the Past, 4 episodes (2015)

Other "living history" BBC series
 The Victorian Kitchen Garden at Leverton, Berkshire (near Chilton Foliat, Wiltshire), 13 episodes (1987).  
 The Victorian Kitchen (with Ruth Mott), 1989.  
 The Victorian Flower Garden, 1991.  
 The Wartime Kitchen and Garden, 1993.  
 Harry's Big Adventure, 1994.  
 The Sweet Makers at Blists Hill Victorian Town, Shrophire, 3 episodes and a Christmas special (2017).
 Victorian Slum House at East End of London, 5 episodes (2016) - London slum life during Victorian era.  
 The 1900 House at 50 Elliscombe Road, Charlton, South-East London, 10 episodes (1999).  
 The 1940s House at 17 Braemar Gardens, West Wickham, Kent, 5 episodes (2001) – a family "living" through the Second World War.  
 The Edwardian Country House at Manderston, 2002 (6 episodes).  
 Treats From The Edwardian Country House, 2002 (6 episodes).  
 Regency House Party, at Kentchurch Court, 2004 (8 episodes).  
 Coal House, at Stack Square in the Welsh hills of Blaenavon, 2009 (12 episodes) – a 1920s Welsh mining community, including a 1944 wartime special.
 The 1900 Island, at Anglesey, 2019 (4 episodes) - a 1900 fishing village in Anglesey
 Turn Back Time – The High Street, at Shepton Mallet in Somerset, 2010 (6 episodes)
 Back in Time for..., 2015; each series takes one "typical" family or multiple individuals relating to the topic (e.g., factory workers in Back in Time for the Factory) and immerses them in life of past decades.
 The Victorian House of Arts and Crafts, 2019 (4 episodes)

References

 
Reenactment of the late modern period
Historical reality television series